Tutak District is a district of Ağrı Province of Turkey. Its seat is the town Tutak. Its area is 1,407 km2, and its population is 28,927 (2021).

Composition
There is one municipality in Tutak District:
 Tutak

There are 80 villages in Tutak District:

 Adakent
 Ahmetabat
 Akyele
 Alacahan
 Aşağıkarahalit
 Aşağıkargalık
 Aşağıköşkköy
 Aşağıkülecik
 Aşağıözdek
 Atabindi
 Ataköy
 Azizler
 Bahçeköy
 Batmış
 Bayındır
 Beydamarlı
 Bintosun
 Bişi
 Bolaşlı
 Bozkaş
 Bulutpınar
 Burnubulak
 Çelebaşı
 Çırpılı
 Çobanoba
 Çukurkonak
 Dağlıca
 Daldalık
 Damlakaya
 Dayıpınarı
 Dereköy
 Dibelek
 Dikbıyık
 Dikme
 Doğangün
 Dorukdibi
 Dönertaş
 Döşkaya
 Ekincek
 Erdal
 Ergeçidi
 Esmer
 Geçimli
 Gültepe
 Güneşgören
 Hacıyusuf
 Ikigözüm
 Ipekkuşak
 Isaabat
 Karaağaç
 Karacan
 Karahan
 Karakuyu
 Kaşönü
 Kesik
 Kılıçgediği
 Mızrak
 Mollahasan
 Ocakbaşı
 Oğlaksuyu
 Ortayamaç
 Otluca
 Ozanpınar
 Öndül
 Palandöken
 Sarıgöze
 Sincan
 Soğukpınar
 Sorguçlu
 Suvar
 Şekerbulak
 Taşbudak
 Uzunöz
 Yayıklı
 Yenikent
 Yeniköy
 Yukarıkarahalit
 Yukarıkargalık
 Yukarıköşk
 Yukarıözdek

References

Districts of Ağrı Province